The Creil Woods Dutch: Creiler Woud or Kreilse Bos was a forest in an area that is now partially the northeast of North Holland and partially submerged in the IJsselmeer and Wadden Sea, between what is currently Texel and Enkhuizen.

The woods are known for having been the location of a large hunt organised by Floris II, Count of Holland in 1119.

The 1170 All Saints' Flood largely destroyed the forest as it was submerged during the birth of the Zuiderzee.

Part of the area that the forest once inhabited has been reclaimed as the Wieringermeer Polder in 1927. Remains of the forest can still be found on the floor of the Wadden Sea and IJsselmeer.

The Creil Woods is the namesake to the towns of Creil, Kreil and Kreileroord.

Forests of the Netherlands
Geography of North Holland